The Welsh Rugby Union Division Four East (also called the SWALEC Division Four East for sponsorship reasons) is a rugby union league in Wales.

Competition
There are 12 clubs in the WRU Division Four East. During the course of a season (which lasts from September to May) each club plays the others twice, once at their home ground and once at the Hpme ground of their opponents for a total of 22 games for each club, with a total of 132 games in each season. Teams receive four points for a win and two point for a draw, an additional bonus point is awarded to either team if they score four tries or more in a single match. No points are awarded for a loss though the losing team can gain a bonus point for finishing the match within seven points of the winning team. Teams are ranked by total points, then the number of tries scored and then points difference. At the end of each season, the club with the most points is crowned as champion. If points are equal the tries scored then points difference determines the winner. The team who is declared champion at the end of the season is eligible for promotion to the WRU Division Three East. The two lowest placed teams are relegated into the WRU Division Five East.

Sponsorship 
In 2008 the Welsh Rugby Union announced a new sponsorship deal for the club rugby leagues with SWALEC valued at £1 million (GBP). The initial three year sponsorship was extended at the end of the 2010/11 season, making SWALEC the league sponsors until 2015. The leagues sponsored are the WRU Divisions one through to seven.

 (2002-2005) Lloyds TSB
 (2005-2008) Asda
 (2008-2015) SWALEC

2011/2012 Season

League teams
Abercarn RFC
Blaenavon RFC
Blaina RFC
Caldicot RFC
Cardiff HSOB RFC
Chepstow RFC
Cwmbran RFC
Machen RFC
New Tredegar RFC
Oakdale RFC
Taffs Well RFC
Talywain RFC

2011/2012 Table

2010/2011 Season

League teams
 Abercarn RFC
 Blaenavon RFC
 Chepstow RFC
 Crumlin RFC
 Cwmbran RFC
 Machen RFC
 Nantyglo RFC
 Nelson RFC
 New Tredegar RFC
 Oakdale RFC
 Senghenydd RFC
 Talywain RFC

2010/2011 Table

2009/2010 Season

League teams
 Abertillery RFC
 Abercarn RFC
 Chepstow RFC
 Crumlin RFC
 Machen RFC
 Monmouth RFC
 Nantyglo RFC
 New Tredegar RFC
 Old Illtydians RFC
 Risca RFC
 St. Joseph's RFC
 Talywain RFC

2009/2010 table

2008/2009 Season

League teams
 Brynithel RFC
 Chepstow RFC
 Crumlin RFC
 Llandaff RFC
 Machen RFC
 Monmouth RFC
 Nantyglo RFC
 Pontllanfraith RFC
 Rhiwbina RFC
 Risca RFC
 St. Joseph's RFC
 Tredegar Ironsides RFC

2008/2009 table

2007/2008 Season

League teams
 Abercarn RFC
 Abertillery/Blaenau Gwent RFC
 Brynithel RFC
 Gwernyfed RFC
 Llandaff RFC
 Machen RFC
 Monmouth RFC
 Nantyglo RFC
 Rhiwbina RFC
 Risca RFC
 Talywain RFC
 Tredegar Ironsides RFC

2007/2008 table

* Although Talywain RFC played out almost all matches for the 2007-08 season they withdrew from the league before the end of the season. All games played against Talywain by the other teams in the league were classed as null and void.

2006/2007 Season

League teams
 Brynithel RFC
 Crumlin RFC
 Garndiffaith RFC
 Llandaff RFC
 Llandaff North RFC
 Machen RFC
 Monmouth RFC
 Nantyglo RFC
 Old Illtydians RFC
 Risca RFC
 Talywain RFC
 Tredegar Ironsides RFC
 Trinant RFC

2006/2007 Table

References

6